(born 28 August 1969) is a Japanese fencer. He competed in the team foil event at the 1988 Summer Olympics.

References

External links
 

1969 births
Living people
Japanese male foil fencers
Olympic fencers of Japan
Fencers at the 1988 Summer Olympics